A stoa is a covered walkway or portico. Stoa or STOA may also refer to:

People
Johan Støa (politician) (1913–1973), Norwegian politician
Johan Støa (sportsperson) (1900–1991), Norwegian sportsman
Ryan Stoa (born 1987), American ice hockey player
Tom Stoa (born 1951),  American politician

Places
Stoa, Norway, a village in Arendal municipality in Aust-Agder county, Norway
Støa, a village in Trysil municipality in Hedmark county, Norway

Other
Stoa (album), an album by Nik Bärtsch
Science and Technology Options Assessment, a committee of members of the European Parliament
Stoa USA, a Christian homeschool forensics organization in the United States
Stoicism, a school of Hellenistic philosophy also known as the Stoa

See also
 List of stoae